The 2019 Gjensidige Cup held in Oslo at the Oslo Spektrum and the Nordstrand Arena between 3–6 January was a friendly handball tournament organised by the Norwegian Handball Federation as a preparation of the host nation to the 2019 World Men's Handball Championship.

Results

Round robin
All times are local (UTC+01:00).

Final standing

References

External links
Tournament page in Norwegian Federation website

Gjensidige Cup
2019 in Norwegian sport
Handball competitions in Norway
Gjensidige Cup